Black huckleberry is a common name for several plants and may refer to:

Gaylussacia baccata, native to eastern North America
Vaccinium membranaceum, native to western North America